

List of countries

See also

Melanesia
Melanesia-related lists
Melanesia